The Myth of Redemptive Violence is an archetypal plot in literature, especially in imperial cultures.  One of the oldest versions of this story is the creation myth of Babylon (the Enûma Elish) from around 1250 B.C.  Walter Wink coined the term as part of an analysis of its impact on modern culture and its role in maintaining oppressive power structures in his book The Powers That Be.

Narrative and effect
While contrasting the Enûma Elish with the Genesis creation myth found in the Book of Genesis, Wink examines the psychological effects of each phase of the story. He asserts that every phase of the narrative serves to reinforce the ideology of the status quo and convince us to perpetuate the ruling power structure.

Primal chaos
The primacy of Tiamat suggests that chaos and evil are the original and natural state of the universe. This can be used to convince us to fear and oppose any threat to the current order, under the assumption that things can only get worse. Superheroes especially have dark origins (for example, the murder of Bruce Wayne's parents and the destruction of planet Krypton), and the pervasiveness of evil is depicted by the resurrection of villains in horror movies and cartoons, the exaggerated presence of violent crime in news coverage, and the overwhelming number and variety of bad creatures in The Lord of the Rings.

Tammuz
Tiamat and her allies oppress the other gods, who, at first, seem powerless to resist. This acknowledges the effectiveness of alternative systems, and gives us the guilty pleasure of vicariously harming our "betters" and breaking their rules. However, all this is constrained by the exaggerated flaws of the antagonists, which foreshadow their failure and make us ashamed to identify with them. Horror films tend to emphasize this part of the narrative to the extreme, whereas superhero stories often marginalize it.

Heroism
Marduk offers to defeat Tiamat in exchange for absolute rule over the remaining gods, and they all agree. This elevates "might makes right" to a contract made at the beginning of the universe.  People are inclined to identify with the hero because of his privileges and his good attributes, and to sympathize with any subsequent oppression.  Modern examples include James Bond's license to kill, the gold mine given to Doc Savage's father, Friday's loyalty to Robinson Crusoe, the brazen dishonesty of Jedi knights, the extremes of Jack Bauer, etc.

Triumph
Marduk slays his enemies in creative, gory, and intricate ways, then goes on to enslave their underlings. This shows that good prevails and evil suffers; the corollary to this is that those who prevail are good. This gives us the catharsis of vengeance and indignation. Once again we can sadistically enjoy a character's suffering, but this time in a sanctioned, acceptable context.  The spectacular downfall and glorious victory prompt us to reject the antagonist and  reaffirm our commitment to the winning party, respectively. Action movies and video games tend to have a decisive final battle.  An opposition leader's death scene often includes ridiculously thorough destruction of his or her body, property, and/or organization, such as Dr. No drowning in the core of his nuclear reactor, which then melts down.

Redemption
Marduk makes the world from Tiamat's corpse and humanity from the blood of Kingu. This leaves us with the message that our prosperity and even our very existence required past violence and destruction; as Wink puts it, "We are the outcome of deicide." This helps justify recent and ongoing violence by appealing to our self-interest.  The death or defeat of the antagonist tends to be immediately followed by an idyllic happy ending in simple, violent plots of all stripes.  Current examples include the Ewok percussion instrument made from Storm Trooper and other Imperial helmets (or heads) at the end of Return of the Jedi, and the brain surgery Doc Savage uses to turn criminals into productive citizens.

The Two Brothers 

The Tale of Two Brothers is an ancient Egyptian story from around the 13th century BCE. The narrative is preserved on the Papyrus D'Orbiney. [Tale of Two Brothers] which had belonged to Seti II (1209-1205 B.C.) of the nineteenth Egyptian dynasty when he was crown prince [William Matthew Flinders Petrie, Egyptian Tales: Translated from the Papyri, 1895, p. 66 ] and may have been a political satire based in part on his own difficulties with his half brother, the usurper Amenmesse[J. H. Breasted Ancient Records of Egypt, Part Three, §§ 239ff. ], but the historical facts concerning this period are so uncertain as to render such a conclusion speculative. The text has similarities to the story of Joseph in the house of Potiphar, in Genesis 39:1-20, however the relation between the two texts is unclear, if, indeed, there is one.[Shaw, Ian. & Nicholson, Paul. The Dictionary of Ancient Egypt, p. 54. The British Museum Press, 1995] Further elements of the story seem to be derived from the myths concerning Osiris' death and resurrection.[Erman, Adolph. Life in Ancient Egypt. p. 379. Dover Publications, 1971. ] The protagonists Anpu and Bata both bear names of gods of the 17th nome of Upper Egypt.

Synopsis
Bata lives with his married brother Anpu. One day, when Anpu is not at home, his wife tries to seduce Bata, and, having been repelled, accuses Bata of having made advances towards her. Anpu grows angry and wants to kill his younger brother who flees. Pre-Harakhte saves him by creating a body of water full of crocodiles between him and his brother. Bata tells his brother what has occurred and, as proof of his sincerity, cuts off his genitals which are swallowed by a fish. Anpu returns home and kills his wife. Bata lives alone in the wilderness until the gods create a wife for him. Bata loves her very much and reveals to her that his heart is hidden in a pine. Pharaoh, on learning of her existence has her brought to his court. She tells him Bata's secret and he has the pine cut down, killing Bata. Anpu goes to look for his brother, and after finding his body he searches for his heart and finds it after years of searching. Bata is revived and wants to take revenge on his wife. He changes himself into a beautiful bull and his brother takes him to Pharaoh. Bata reveals himself to his wife who has him killed. Two drops of his blood are spilled and from them grow two persea trees, incarnations of Bata. His wife has them felled, but a splinter of their wood enters her mouth, she swallows it and becomes pregnant. She gives birth to a boy, a reincarnation of Bata, who is acknowledged as the Pharaoh's heir. When Pharaoh dies and he becomes king, he has the queen tried and killed.
 
•	P. D'Orbiney (P. Brit. Mus. 10183), written towards the end of the 19th dynasty by the scribe Ennana.[Lichtheim, Ancient Egyptian Literature, vol.2, 1980, p. 203 ] It was acquired by the British Museum in 1857.

See also
Joseph Campbell
Carl Jung
Richard Dawkins
René Girard
Liberation Theology
Dominator culture
Tale of Two Brothers

References

External links
The Powers that be: Theology for a New Millenium. New York: DOubleday Publishing, 1999.
Facing the Myth of Redemptive Violence article by Walter Wink, August 2006.

Narratology
Violence